Stefano Cason (born 9 July 1995) is an Italian football player. He plays for Nocerina.

Club career
He made his professional debut in the Lega Pro for Melfi on 6 September 2015 in a game against Juve Stabia and scored twice on his debut.

He joined Serie C club Virtus Francavilla on permanent basis on 7 July 2018, signing a 3-year contract.

On 14 July 2019, he signed with Pianese.

On 24 September 2020 he joined Matelica.

On 22 January 2021 he moved to Fano.

On 16 September 2021 he joined Nocerina in Serie D.

References

External links
 

1995 births
People from Belluno
Living people
Italian footballers
Association football defenders
A.C.N. Siena 1904 players
A.S. Melfi players
Ternana Calcio players
Trapani Calcio players
Carrarese Calcio players
U.S. Catanzaro 1929 players
Virtus Francavilla Calcio players
S.S. Matelica Calcio 1921 players
Alma Juventus Fano 1906 players
A.S.D. Nocerina 1910 players
Serie B players
Serie C players
Serie D players
Footballers from Veneto
Sportspeople from the Province of Belluno